Demyanovka is a rural locality (a selo) in Innokentyevsky Selsoviet of Zavitinsky District, Amur Oblast, Russia. The population was 105 as of 2018. There are 2 streets.

Geography 
Demyanovka is located 24 km southwest of Zavitinsk (the district's administrative centre) by road. Innokentyevka is the nearest rural locality.

References 

Rural localities in Zavitinsky District